The One Piece franchise has spawned thirteen television specials that aired on Fuji TV. Of these specials, the first four, as well as the sixth, eighth, tenth and eleventh are original stories created by the anime staff with the exception of the fifth, seventh, ninth, twelfth and thirteenth specials, which are alternate re-tellings of certain story arcs.

On April 7, 2013, a two-part hour-long crossover TV special, between Dragon Ball Z, One Piece and Toriko, referred to as Dream 9 Toriko & One Piece & Dragon Ball Z Super Collaboration Special!! aired on Fuji TV. The first part is named  and the second is titled . The plot has the International Gourmet Organization (from Toriko) sponsoring the Tenka'ichi Shokuōkai, a race with no rules that characters from all three series compete in.

Three of the specials received limited theatrical releases in South Korea in 2014; Episode of Merry, Episode of Nami and Episode of Luffy were released on August 28, December 6 and December 10, grossing 28,590,200, 12,319,500 and 11,342,500 respectively. As with the franchise's anime television series, specials eight through thirteen have been streamed with English subtitles in North America by Funimation and Crunchyroll and released on home video by Funimation with Japanese and English-dubbed versions.

Specials

Home Media

Japan
The first special was released on VHS, and specials five onward have been released on Blu-ray. The Log Collections are available on DVD only.

English
The TV specials have been released on DVD and Blu-ray.

See also
 List of One Piece media
 List of One Piece films

Notes

References

External links
 One Piece on IMDb

One Piece lists
Japanese television specials
Lists of television specials
Funimation
One Piece mass media